Dichomeris deltoxyla is a moth in the family Gelechiidae. It was described by Edward Meyrick in 1934. It is found in the Chinese provinces of Jiangxi and Guangdong.

References

Moths described in 1934
deltoxyla